Saheli is a 1960 Pakistani Urdu language music blockbuster classical film directed by S. M. Yusuf and co-produced by F. M. Sardar. It is written by Hasrat Lakhnavi while music is composed by A. Hameed. It features Nayyar Sultana, Shamim Ara and Darpan (actor) in the lead while supporting actors features Aslam Pervaiz along with others. It was screened in 2016 by the Lok Virsa Museum. Saheli is the first film of Yusuf to be made in the country after he migrated to Pakistan, and the 1960s first prominent film of Sultana, Ara and Darpan, leading the film to celebrate silver Jubilee.

It was later nominated for the presidential awards and subsequently became the recipient of four Nigar Awards, a film award in Pakistan presented by the Nigar magazine to recognise those who have made contributions to the cinema of Pakistan. At the time of award ceremony, Shamim Ara refused to accept the Best Supporting Actress award, citing she played protagonist role while Nayyar Sultana appeared as supporting actress. Both actresses, according to the BBC Urdu, appeared in the lead. The publication also included it in the list of ten best films from Pakistan.

Plot 
Saheli revolves around cultural reforms when two friends Jamila and Razia argue about polygamous marriage. Both friends live and raised together in Rawalpindi. One protagonist friend Razia trying to convince her friend Jamila by seeking her consent to marry her husband Darpan, supposed to be his second wife. The wife also makes efforts to convince her husband to marry her friend in an attempt to create a favourable environment for the two protagonists so that they can live together after marrying the same person. Subsequently, Razia leaves for her relatives in Hyderabad after they called her there, and the two lives in solidarity as a result. When the two feels lonely, they begin miss each other and communicates via writing letters. 
When writing to Jamila, Razia always starts her letter with emotional opening phrase "mere pyare habib" (my dear beloved). When Jamila’s brother Aslam Pervaiz learns about their communication patterns, he intercept the letters and sometimes avoid to post or pass the letters to each other. The two protagonists lost contact due to Jamila’s brother interception.

The eager to meet her friend leads Jamila to deliberately pretend to be an ill and requests the doctor to fake the situation asking her mother that the two should meet either sending Jamila to Razia or Razia should be called to her home. Following the faking illness, physician visits Jamila home where he falls in love with her and a marriage date is fixed as a result. On wedding day, the doctor dies in a car crash. Her family learns about an identical person (duplicate of Darpan). They rush to the hospital. The doctor's death leads Jamila to be experience distress event, and she suffers from psychological trauma. Her family admits her daughter in the same hospital in Karachi. After she opens her eyes in hospital, an identical person appears before her. She doesn't adequately differentiate the new doctor (psychological specialist) and the two marries. Her mother describes the incident to Razia, the whom latter visits her home and subsequently sings a song accordingly. She advises her husband to not reveal the truth, but one day doctor's servant explains the story to Razia's friend, leading her to know about her new husband. She speaks to Razia over phone in an attempt to make an apology for marrying the identical doctor unknowingly. While on the phone, she hears arguments between Jamila's brother and Razia when her brother enters in the room and threats to rape her friend. On hearing this, she subsequently arrives Razia's home with a weapon and kills her own brother.

Cast 

 Shamim Ara as Jamila
 Nayyar Sultana as Razia
 Darpan as doctors (dual role)
 Aslam Pervaiz as Aslam, Jamila's brother
 Bahar Begum
 Agha Talish
 Nirala
 Faizi
 Sharara
 Hasrat Lakhnavi
 Salma Mumtaz as Jamila's mother
 G.N. Butt
 Bibbo
 Rakhshi
 Zamurrad
 Imdad Hussain
 (Guests: Lehri, Saqi, Ali Baba, Faizi, Sultan Rahi (extra))

Soundtrack

Release and box office 

The film was released on 23 December 1960. It became golden jubilee hit of the year by completing 50 weeks in the Karachi circuit. It was also released in the International Film Festival of India in the following year.

References

Notes

External links 
 

1960 films
1960s Urdu-language films
1960s musical drama films
Films scored by A. Hameed
Pakistani black-and-white films
Pakistani musical drama films
Films set in Karachi
Films shot in Pakistan
Nigar Award winners